John Dunmore  (born 6 August 1923) is a New Zealand academic, historian, author, playwright, and publisher.

Biography
Dunmore was born in Trouville-sur-Mer, France, lived in Jersey under German Occupation during World War II, and then in England, where he received a BA from the University of London. He emigrated to New Zealand in 1950. He completed a PhD under historian J. C. Beaglehole at Victoria University of Wellington in 1962, studying the French contribution to the exploration of the Pacific Ocean in the 18th century. He was Professor of French, Head of the Department of Modern Languages, and Dean of Humanities at Massey University, from which he retired in 1985.

Dunmore's main field of history is the exploration of the Pacific, particularly by French navigators. He has written two major biographies of La Pérouse, and translated and edited his journals (which he rediscovered after they had been misfiled in the French National Archives). In addition, he has written biographies and edited the journals of both Surville and of Bougainville. His biography of de Surville, The fateful voyage of the St. Jean Baptiste, won the Wattie Book of the Year award in 1970.

His work is highly regarded by scholars as well as by the public:
 "John Dunmore has done more than anyone to bring our attention to the achievements of eighteenth and nineteenth century French explorers of the Pacific"
 "cette étonnante biographie, élégamment écrite (this stunning and elegantly written biography (of Bougainville))"
 "The succinct and perceptive evaluation of the voyages and the Anglo-French rivalry is of great use"

Dunmore has written a variety of other books, including a series of thrillers under the pseudonym "Jason Calder". He has produced a book of 18th-century recipes, Mrs Cook's book of recipes for mariners in distant seas. Some of the recipes were derived from the logs of explorers of the day. He has also written plays, held office in the Playwrights Association of New Zealand, and written a history of the association.

In his capacity as professor of French, Dunmore was president of the New Zealand Federation des Alliances Francaises.

He established two separate publishing firms, the Dunmore Press (1969–1984) and Heritage Press (1985–2004). The Dunmore Press, a substantial New Zealand publisher of academic books, eventually became part of the Thomson publishing group, in 2004.

Honours and awards
In 1990, Dunmore was awarded the New Zealand 1990 Commemoration Medal. In the 2001 Queen's Birthday Honours, he was appointed a Companion of the New Zealand Order of Merit, for services to literature and historical research.
 
The French Government appointed Dunmore as a Chevalier dans la Légion d'honneur (Knight of the Legion of Honor) in 1976, and an Officier dans l'Ordre des Palmes académiques (Officer of the Academic Palms) in 1986. He was promoted to Officier de la Légion d'honneur (Officer of the Legion of Honor) in 2007, becoming only the tenth New Zealander to hold this level of the order and the third New Zealander to be promoted to the superior rank of Officer after Lieutenant Colonel James Waddell and Nancy Wake.

Massey University awarded Dunmore an honorary DLitt degree in 2006. Fellow Pacific scholars honoured him with a Festschrift: 

The Dunmore Medal for research into French achievements and development in the Pacific is named after him.

See also
List of foreign recipients of the Légion d'Honneur
List of Foreign recipients of the Ordre des Palmes Académiques

Books
This list of books by Dunmore is representative but by no means complete. He has also written many articles, book chapters, reviews, plays and other items. A list of his scholarly writings to 2005 is included in Pacific Journeys at pp. 15–19.

Biographies
 
 
  Published also by ABC Books, Sydney, Australia.
  Published also by ABC Books, Sydney, Australia & University of Alaska Press, 2007, 
 
  Translation of Pacific Explorer.

Translated and edited journals of explorers

Other historical works

Fiction
"Jason Calder" is a pseudonym for John Dunmore.

Other
  Also published by the Australian National Maritime Museum.

References

External links
Dunmore Press ( the site still exists and is being updated)

1923 births
Living people
People from Trouville-sur-Mer
Alumni of the University of London
Companions of the New Zealand Order of Merit
Academic staff of the Massey University
New Zealand biographers
Male biographers
New Zealand crime fiction writers
20th-century New Zealand historians
New Zealand male novelists
Officiers of the Légion d'honneur
New Zealand recipients of the Légion d'honneur
Officiers of the Ordre des Palmes Académiques
Victoria University of Wellington alumni
20th-century New Zealand novelists
20th-century biographers
20th-century New Zealand male writers
New Zealand justices of the peace
21st-century New Zealand historians